The 2016 FIU Panthers football team represented Florida International University (FIU) in the 2016 NCAA Division I FBS football season. The Panthers played their home games at the FIU Stadium in Miami, Florida, and competed in the East Division of Conference USA (C–USA). They were led by fourth-year head coach Ron Turner until he was fired on September 25, 2016. Defensive coordinator Ron Cooper was promoted to interim head coach for the remainder of the season. They finished the season 4–8, 4–4 in C-USA play to finish in fourth place the East Division.

Schedule
FIU announced its 2016 football schedule on February 4, 2016. The 2016 schedule consists of 7 home and 5 away games in the regular season. The Panthers will host C–USA foes Florida Atlantic, Louisiana Tech, Marshall, and Middle Tennessee, and will travel to Charlotte, Old Dominion, UTEP, and Western Kentucky (WKU).

The team will play four non–conference games, three home games against Indiana and Maryland both from the Big Ten Conference, and Central Florida (UCF) from the American Athletic Conference, and one road game against Massachusetts (UMass).

Schedule Source:

Game summaries

Indiana

Maryland

at Massachusetts

UCF

Florida Atlantic

at UTEP

at Charlotte

Louisiana Tech

Middle Tennessee

at WKU

Marshall

at Old Dominion

Awards and honors

Conference USA Players of the Week

Awards

References

FIU
FIU Panthers football seasons
FIU Panthers football